Richard Nagy (born 9 March 1993) is a Slovak swimmer from Želiezovce. He is a member of the Hungarian community in Slovakia.

He competed at the 2016 Summer Olympics in Rio de Janeiro, and the 2020 Summer Olympics in Tokyo.

References

External links

 

1993 births
Living people
Slovak male swimmers
Male long-distance swimmers
Olympic swimmers of Slovakia
Swimmers at the 2016 Summer Olympics
People from Levice District
Sportspeople from the Nitra Region
Hungarians in Slovakia
Swimmers at the 2020 Summer Olympics